João Coelho Neto, known more commonly as Preguinho (8 February 1905 – 1 October 1979) was a Brazilian footballer who played as a striker. He was born in Rio de Janeiro.

Son of Brazilian writer Coelho Neto, Preguinho was born on 8 February 1905. He played from 1925-1938 for Fluminense and scored 184 goals.

For Brazil he participated in the 1930 FIFA World Cup and was the first captain of the Brazil national team, scoring the first goal ever from Brazil in a FIFA World Cup in a match against Yugoslavia, and two further goals in a match with Bolivia.

He died at the age of 74 on 29 September 1979. In his honour, Fluminense dedicated a statue. A Brazilian TV-programme of his life was produced by Carlos Niemeyer for Canal 100 and directed by Carlos Leonam and Oswaldo Caldeira.

International goals
Brazil's goal tally first

References

1905 births
1930 FIFA World Cup players
1979 deaths
Footballers from Rio de Janeiro (city)
Brazilian footballers
Association football forwards
Brazil international footballers
Fluminense FC players
Brazilian people of indigenous peoples descent
Brazilian people of Portuguese descent